This is a list of members of the Western Australian Legislative Council elected to serve a term between 22 May 2021 and 21 May 2025.

Members of Western Australian parliaments by term
Members of the Western Australian Legislative Council